Ollo may refer to:

People
 Desiré Ollo (born 1965), Gabonese boxer
 Gustavo Ollo (born 1963), Argentinian boxer
 Imanol Erviti Ollo (born 1983), Spanish road bicycle racer
 Karl Ollo, Russian figure skater
 Manuel de Irujo y Ollo (1891–1981), Spanish politician
 Ollo Kambou (born 1986), Ivory Coast football player
 Patrice Ollo N'Doumba (born 1986), Cameroonian football player, who has last playing for KuPS

Places
 Ollo, Navarre, Spain

Other
 Ollo, character in the Ollo in the Sunny Valley Fair game